This is the discography for American hip hop musician Guru.

Studio albums

Remix albums

Compilation albums

Mixtapes

Group albums

Guest appearances 
1990: "Jazz Thing" (from the soundtrack of Mo' Better Blues)
1991: "Down the Line" (from the Nice & Smooth album Ain't a Damn Thing Changed)
1991: "Qui Seme Le Vent Recolte Le Tempo (Gang Starr Remix)" (from an MC Solaar 12" single)
1992: "A Buncha Niggas" (from the Heavy D & The Boyz album Blue Funk, also featuring Biggie Smalls, Busta Rhymes, Rob-O, Third Eye)
1992: "A Little Spice (Gangstarr Remix)" (from the Loose Ends album Tighten Up Vol. 1)
1992: "It's Getting Hectic" (from The Brand New Heavies album Heavy Rhyme Experience, Vol. 1)
1992: "Sassy (from the Neneh Cherry album Homebrew)
1993: "Why Can't Lovers" (from Lisa Lisa single Skip to My Lu)
1993: "Patti Dooke" (from De La Soul album Buhloone Mindstate)
1993: "Season For Change" (from the Ronny Jordan album The Quiet Revolution)
1993: "Listen (Guru Remix)" (from an Urban Species 12" single)
1993: "Stop Lookin' at Me" (In collaboration with the Cutthroats from the soundtrack of Menace II Society)
1993: "Do It Any Way You Wanna" on the soundtrack album Addams Family Values: Music from the Motion Picture
1994: "Why Cant Lovers" (from Lisa Lisa album LL77)
1994: "Borough Check" (from the Digable Planets album Blowout Comb)
1994: "I've Lost My Ignorance" (from the Dream Warriors album Subliminal Simulation)
1994: "Black Monday" (from the Buckshot LeFonque single "Another Day")
1995: "B-Boy Mastermind" (from the DJ Krush album Krush) – This appears on the Japanese import only.
1995: "Serious Rap Shit" (from the Group Home album Livin' Proof)
1995: "Most Wanted Man" (from the DJ Krush album Meiso, also featuring Big Shug)
1996: "Fed Up (Remix)" (from House of Pain album Truth Crushed to Earth Shall Rise Again)
1996: "Listen Here" (from The New Groove: The Blue Note Remix Project)
1996: "What You Expected" (from the DJ Honda album h)
1997: "The Way It Iz" (from Rhyme & Reason (soundtrack))
1997: "For da Love" (from Afu-Ra and EZD unofficial release "A D&D Project In Association With DJ Premier Vol. 1")
1998: "Nights in Harlem (Darkchild Extended Remix)" (from the Luther Vandross album I Know, featuring uncredited background vocals by Brandy)
1998: "Salute Part II" (from the M.O.P. album First Family 4 Life)
1998: "Trilogy of Terror" (from the Afu-Ra 12 "Whirlwind Thru Cities")
1999: "NY Niggaz" (from the Sway & King Tech album This or That)
1999: "The Legacy" (from the Group Home album A Tear for the Ghetto)
1999: "Bare Witness" (from the Choclair album Ice Cold)
1999: "Whatever Happened to Gus" (Word to the Drums mix) (from the Medeski Martin & Wood album Combustication Remix EP)
2000: "Games" (from the Big L album The Big Picture, also featuring Sadat X)
2001: "Hot Shit" (from a D&D All Stars 12" single, also featuring Big Daddy Kane, Sadat X and Greg Nice)
2001: "Worst Comes to Worst" (from the Dilated Peoples album Expansion Team)
2002: "Blvd." (from the Afu-Ra album Life Force Radio)
2002: "Karma" (from the Adam F 12" single also featuring Carl Thomas)
2003: "Weed Scented" (from the A.G. album The Dirty Version)
2003: "Condor (Espionage)" (from the DJ Cam album Soulshine)
2003: "Knowledge of Self" (from the BT album Emotional Technology)
2003: "Traume" (from the Spax album Engel und Ratten)
2004: "The Best" (from the Chief Kamachi album Cult Status)
2004: "Αυτή Τη Ζωή (This Life)" (from the Goin' Through album La Sagrada Familia)
2004: "Home" (from the Kreators album Live Coverage, also featuring Akrobatik, Big Shug, Ed O.G., Krumbsnatcha)
2005: "Party Hard" (from The Perceptionists album Black Dialogue featuring & produced by Camu Tao)
2005: "Counter Punch" and "Gangsta Luv" (from the Big Shug album Never Say Die)
2006: "Junk" (from the Ferry Corsten album L.E.F.)
2007: "Major Game" (from the Domingo album The Most Underrated)
2007: "The Otherside" (from the Slightly Stoopid album Chronchitis)
2008: "Watucamehere 4" (from the Downsyde album All City)
2010: "You Got to Luv It" (from the Cradle Orchestra album Transcended Elements'')

References 

Discographies of American artists
Hip hop discographies